Gula Tidend (meaning Gula Times) is a former Norwegian newspaper. It was established in 1904 by Johannes Lavik, and disestablished in 1996. During World War II in response to the censorship of the occupying forces the paper temporarily ended its operations on 10 April 1940, a day after the occupation. The newspaper was a proponent for the Nynorsk language in Western Norway, located in Bergen.

Among its editors were Per Håland, who edited Gula Tidend for 25 years, from 1954 to 1979.

References

1905 establishments in Norway
1996 disestablishments in Norway
Defunct newspapers published in Norway
Newspapers published in Bergen
Norwegian-language newspapers
Nynorsk
Publications established in 1905
Publications disestablished in 1996